This page lists the winners and nominees for the Soul Train Music Award for Best Rap Album. The award was first given out during the 1989 ceremony, before being retired in 1996.

Winners and nominees
Winners are listed first and highlighted in bold.

1980s

1990s

References

Soul Train Music Awards
Awards established in 1989
Awards disestablished in 1996
Album awards